Edward B. "Ted" Murphy (born October 30, 1971 in West Newton, Massachusetts) is an American rower. He is a 1994 graduate of Dartmouth and a member of the Dartmouth Crew and National Rowing Foundation Hall of Fame.

References

External links
 
 
 

1971 births
Living people
American male rowers
Rowers at the 1996 Summer Olympics
Rowers at the 2000 Summer Olympics
Olympic silver medalists for the United States in rowing
World Rowing Championships medalists for the United States
Medalists at the 2000 Summer Olympics
Pan American Games medalists in rowing
Pan American Games gold medalists for the United States
Rowers at the 1999 Pan American Games
Dartmouth Big Green rowers
Sportspeople from Newton, Massachusetts
Medalists at the 1999 Pan American Games